Kalaat es Senam, Kalaat Senan, or  Kalâat Snan (Tunisian Arabic: قلعة سنان) is a town in western Tunisia in the Kef Governorate.  It is the administrative center of Kalaat Senan Delegation and had 15,621 inhabitants ( census). The town is a market town for the agriculture in the area, where wheat and oats are grown and cattle and sheep are grazed.

Kalaat es Senam is named after the nearby fortress (qalat) built upon the Jugurtha Tableland (a mesa).

Notes

External links
 Photographs of the Jugurtha Tableland

Populated places in Tunisia
Communes of Tunisia